T-Rac is the mascot of the NFL's Tennessee Titans. He is a raccoon, the state animal of Tennessee. He debuted during the team's inaugural preseason home game in August 1999 against the Atlanta Falcons as the Titans, who were previously known as the Houston Oilers from 1960-1996 and the Tennessee Oilers from 1997-1998. He was first played by Pete Nelson, who played the character for 17 years before retiring from the position before the 2016 NFL season.

T-Rac has over 68,000 followers on Facebook, 7,000 followers on Twitter, and over 9,000 followers on Instagram.   The Tennessee Titans very own T-Rac won the "Most Awesome Mascot." presented by Cartoon Network inaugural "Hall of Games." T-Rac was pitted against the Gorilla from the Phoenix Suns, Bango from the Milwaukee Bucks, and the Philadelphia Phillies' Phillie Phanatic.

Appearances
T-Rac appears at every Tennessee Titans home game at Nissan Stadium. T-Rac has been known to zip-line from the top of the stadium and rappel from buildings in downtown Nashville. The mascot also travels throughout Tennessee to appear in community events, birthday parties, and Play60 programs.

T-Rac also appeared on the season 2 premiere of The Titan Games. He was there to lend support to Bartley Weaver, who portrays the Greek warrior mascot at Titans games.

References

External links
Tidbits about T-Rac
Tennessee Titans

National Football League mascots
Tennessee Titans
Animal mascots
Mascots introduced in 1999